Vino el amor (English title: Along came love) is a Mexican telenovela produced by José Alberto Castro for Televisa. It premiered on August 8, 2016 and ended on February 19, 2017. It is a remake of the Chilean telenovela La chúcara, and stars Irina Baeva and Gabriel Soto.

Plot 
David (Gabriel Soto) loses his wife Lisa (Laura Carmine) in a seemingly unintentional accident, perpetrated by her obsessive sister Graciela (Kimberly Dos Ramos). David becomes depressed to such a degree that he begins to neglect his children, Fernanda (Sofia Castro) and Bobby (Emilio Beltrán Ulrich), and the vineyard he loves so much. His sinister mother-in-law Lilian (Azela Robinson) and supposed best friend Juan (Christian de la Campa) try to take advantage of the situation to steal David's fortune. An unexpected arrival to the vineyard alters their plans.

Luciana (Irina Baeva), a cheerful and impetuous youngster who lived in the vineyard with her family many years ago, was deported to Mexico along with her father Marcos (Alejandro Ávila). This was caused by Lilian, whose goal was to get rid of the entire family, especially Luciana's mother Marta (Cynthia Klitbo), for revenge of past troubles, as she sent officials after them despite having their documents in order and were in progress of becoming U.S. citizens. After her father died, Luciana returns as a beautiful young woman, and disrupts David's life. In their relationship of love and hate, Luciana changes everything for the better and David starts to love life again, along with gaining Luciana's affection. However, with Lilian's hatred towards the lower class due to the fact that her husband cheated on her with a servant, Graciela's obsession for David, and Fernanda's dislike for Luciana, the trio plan to prevent Luciana from ever staying in the United States.

Cast

Main 
 Gabriel Soto as David
 Cynthia Klitbo as Marta 
 Azela Robinson as Lilian
 Irina Baeva as Luciana
 Mar Contreras as Susan
 Moisés Arizmendi as César
 Verónica Jaspeado as Sonia
 Kimberly Dos Ramos as Graciela
 Christian de la Campa as Juan
 Juan Vidal as Gutiérrez
 José Eduardo Derbez as León
 Gloria Aura as Perla
 Sofía Castro as Fernanda
 Raúl Coronado as Miguel
 Mario Loria as Ramón
 Luciano Zacharski as Carlos
 Yanet Sedano as Carito
 Óscar Bonfiglio as Adolfo
 Bárbara López as Erika
 Juan Carlos Serrano as Mark

Recurring 
 Emilio Beltrán Ulrich as Bobby

Guest stars 
 Alejandro Ávila as Marcos
 Laura Carmine as Lisa

Production 
The series is an original story by Julio Rojas Gutiérrez, rewriting for Mexican television by Janely Esther Lee Torres and Vanesa Varela Magallón. It is directed by Salvador Sánchez and Santiago Barbosa as scene directors and Jorge Amaya and Bernardo Nájera as camera directors.

Development 
The development of Vino el amor is based on the Mexican emigration to the United States in search of "the American dream" and how these are humiliated and offended by the police and heartless people. Also touched on topics such as bipolarity. Much of the production is filmed in the vineyards of Napa and Sonoma, also in San Francisco, California, United States. The telenovela also filmed in Mexico City and Tijuana, part of the cast filmed scenes in Foro 14 of Televisa San Ángel.

Casting 
On May 25, 2016, TVyNovelas Magazine confirmed Gabriel Soto and Irina Baeva as the main protagonists. On June 8, 2016, José Alberto Castro confirmed Kimberly Dos Ramos and Christian de la Campa as the main antagonists; both actors had an exclusive contract with Telemundo, and therefore they decided to accept Televisa's job offer. The cast also included actors from other personalities such as Juan Vidal and Luciano Zacharski, who had been working for TV Azteca for years. On June 30, 2016, Laura Carmine was confirmed to guest star in the first few episodes where she play as the wife of Gabriel Soto's character.

For Kimberly Dos Ramos, this project has made her character be hated, as happened to Marjorie de Sousa's character in the telenovela Amores verdaderos. Her character helps a lot in the telenovela to help people who suffer from bipolarity, be able to have a help and confront their situation. Dos Ramos stated: "It is gratifying to know that in some way my character can help the relatives of those who suffer from bipolarity and seek solutions." In late September 2016, Dos Ramos caused controversy in an episode where she was topless, this being an idea of Televisa to be able to increase its ratings in its productions.

Reception 
In the United States, Vino el amor was very well received by the American public only in its premiere it measured 2,143,000 total viewers, becoming one of the most viewed productions of Univision.

Awards and nominations

References

External links 
Official website

Mexican telenovelas
Televisa telenovelas
2016 telenovelas
2016 Mexican television series debuts
2017 Mexican television series endings
Mexican television series based on Chilean television series
Spanish-language telenovelas
Television shows set in Mexico
Television shows set in California